The Niva is a river in the Murmansk Oblast in Russia. The Niva flows out of the Lake Imandra and into the Kandalaksha Gulf of the White Sea. The town of Kandalaksha is located in the estuary of the Niva.

Between 1936 and 1954 three hydroelectric power stations were built on the Niva. Total capacity is 240 MW and annual power production 1390 GWh.

References

Rivers of Murmansk Oblast